The Botswana Stock Exchange Domestic Company Index or BSE DCI, and the Botswana Stock Exchange Foreign Company Index or BSE FCI are the principal stock indices of the Botswana Stock Exchange.  Each is calculated from the weighted averages of the values of their category of stock.  A third index value, the All Company Index, is derived from a weighted average of the two indices.  On the Botswana Stock Exchange, a company that is designated as a "foreign company" is a company that is "dual-listed", meaning that it is also listed on another stock exchange.

Index listings
as of December 2016

Domestic companies

Foreign companies

The list of foreign companies as of December 2016 is:

Venture capital companies
Although not currently part of any official market index, a third BSE category, "Venture Capital Companies", is as follows (all companies are foreign-based unless otherwise disclosed):

A CAP Resources 
African Energy Resources 
Botswana Diamonds plc
Lucara Diamond Corporation
Magnum Gas and Power Limited
Shumba Energy Limited

References

External links
Letshego 2010 Annual Report
Botswana Stock Exchange - "BSE Indices and Share Prices"
 Domestic Companies Listing
 

 
African stock market indices
Economy of Botswana